James Rowe may refer to:

James Rowe (cricketer) (born 1979), former English cricketer
James Rowe (Australian footballer) (born 1999), Australian rules footballer for Adelaide
James Rowe (footballer, born 1983), English association football manager
James Rowe (footballer, born 1991), English association footballer
James Rowe (American football), American football coach
James G. Rowe Jr. (1889–1931), horse trainer
James G. Rowe Sr. (1857–1929), American jockey and horse trainer
James N. Rowe (1938–1989), U.S. Army officer 
Jim Rowe (born 1978), American politician
James H. Rowe (1909–1984), American Democratic political strategist

See also
Jamie Rowe (born 1970), vocalist
James Roe (disambiguation)